Central aortic blood pressure (CAP or CASP) is the blood pressure at the root of aorta. Studies have shown the importance of central aortic pressure and its implications in assessing the efficacy of antihypertensive treatment with respect to cardiovascular risk factors. The traditional method of measuring blood pressure in the arms has been shown to underestimate the efficacy of medications such as amlodipine and overestimate the efficacy of those like atenolol. A clinical trial demonstrated that different medications for lowering blood pressure have different effects on the central aortic pressure and blood flow characteristics, despite producing similar branchial blood pressure readings. The study also indicated that the CAP is a better independent predictor of cardiovascular and kidney outcomes.

References

Further reading
CAFE - The Conduit Artery Functional Endpoint Study